Thomas McIntyre may refer to:

Thomas J. McIntyre (1915–1992), U.S. politician from the state of New Hampshire
Tommy McIntyre (born 1963), Scottish association football player